Lemington is a town in Essex County, Vermont, United States. The population was 87 as of the 2020 census. It is part of the Berlin, NH–VT Micropolitan Statistical Area.

Geography
Lemington is in northeastern Essex County along the Connecticut River, the border between Vermont and New Hampshire. The town is bordered to the southwest by Bloomfield, at its westernmost point by Lewis, to the northwest by Averill, and to the northeast by Canaan, all in Vermont. To the southeast, across the Connecticut, are the towns of Colebrook and Columbia, New Hampshire. Vermont Route 102 runs from south to north along the eastern edge of the town, following the Connecticut. Route 26 leads east across the Connecticut into Colebrook village. The villages of Lemington and Columbia are connected by the covered Columbia Bridge across the Connecticut.

The town's highest point is  Monadnock Mountain, in the eastern part of town overlooking the Connecticut.

Demographics

At the 2000 census there were 107 people, 49 households, and 34 families living in the town. The population density was 3.0 people per square mile (1.2/km2). There were 77 housing units at an average density of 2.2 per square mile (0.8/km2).  The racial makeup of the town was 94.39% White, and 5.61% from two or more races.
Of the 49 households 22.4% had children under the age of 18 living with them, 61.2% were married couples living together, 8.2% had a female householder with no husband present, and 30.6% were non-families. 28.6% of households were one person and 20.4% were one person aged 65 or older. The average household size was 2.18 and the average family size was 2.68.

The age distribution was 22.4% under the age of 18, 2.8% from 18 to 24, 20.6% from 25 to 44, 27.1% from 45 to 64, and 27.1% 65 or older. The median age was 52 years. For every 100 females, there were 118.4 males. For every 100 females age 18 and over, there were 93.0 males.

The median household income was $35,417 and the median family income  was $47,500. Males had a median income of $28,750 versus $24,063 for females. The per capita income for the town was $17,146. There were no families and 1.3% of the population living below the poverty line, including no under eighteens and 5.9% of those over 64.

References

External links 

 
Towns in Vermont
Berlin, New Hampshire micropolitan area
Vermont populated places on the Connecticut River
Towns in Essex County, Vermont